Vazgen Safarian (born 1954 in Tehran) is a retired Iranian Armenian football player who played for Ararat Tehran and Perspolis FC.

References

Living people
1954 births
Sportspeople from Tehran
Ethnic Armenian sportspeople
Iranian footballers
Iranian people of Armenian descent
F.C. Ararat Tehran players
Persepolis F.C. players
Association football goalkeepers